John Armitage (b. 9 May 1874) was an English architect based in Nottingham and London.

Career
He was born on 9 May 1874 in Nottingham, the son of Samuel Fox Armitage (1830-1914) and Joanna Jarrett (1836-1922).

He was educated at Bootham School, York. Then articled to Arthur Brewill and Basil Baily. 

He commenced independent practice in Nottingham in 1898 and opened an office in Westminster in 1900. From 1902 to 1904 he took Francis Giesler Newton as an articled pupil, and from 1903 to 1904 he took William Barnet Wyllie.

On 16 March 1904 he was initiated into the Cordwainer Ward Lodge and was recorded as being resident in Broad Sanctuary, London.

He is recorded as living in Nottingham in the 1901 and 1911 census.

He married Olga Ramsey (1878-1941), daughter of Robert Ramsey farmer, on 1 July 1907 in St Barnabas' Church, Pimlico.

He died in 1953 in Surrey.

Notable works
Electrical company works, Berwick upon Tweed, 1903 (now demolished)
Morley’s Cafe, 34 to 36 Wheeler Gate, Nottingham 1908

References

1874 births
Architects from Nottingham
People educated at Bootham School
Year of death missing